In mathematics, the Shapiro inequality is an inequality proposed by Harold S. Shapiro in 1954.

Statement of the inequality

Then the Shapiro inequality states that

where .

In 2002, P.J. Bushell and J.B. McLeod published an analytical proof for .

Interior local minima of the left-hand side are always (Nowosad, 1968).

Counter-examples for higher n

The first counter-example was found by Lighthill in 1956, for :
 where  is close to 0.

 (Troesch, 1985)

References

 
  They give an analytic proof of the formula for even , from which the result for all  follows. They state  as an open problem.

External links
 Usenet discussion in 1999 (Dave Rusin's notes)
 PlanetMath

Inequalities